Jergović is a surname. Notable people with the surname include:

Filip Jergović, Montenegrin politician
Miljenko Jergović (born 1966), Bosnian writer

See also
Jerković